Jacques Auxiette (3 December 1940 – 10 December 2021) was a French politician, and was the Regional Council President for the Pays de la Loire region in France. Auxiette was president between 2004 and 2015, and was re-elected to the office in the March 2010 council elections. He was a member of the Socialist Party.

He was one of the strongest opponents of the reunification of Loire-Atlantique to its historical region, Brittany.

References

1940 births
2021 deaths
Presidents of the Regional Council of Pays de la Loire
Members of the Regional Council of Pays de la Loire
Socialist Party (France) politicians
People from Indre
Politicians from Centre-Val de Loire
Mayors of places in Pays de la Loire
University of Clermont-Ferrand alumni